Minor Glacier is in Bridger-Teton National Forest, in the U.S. state of Wyoming on the west side of the Continental Divide in the northern Wind River Range. Minor Glacier is in  the Bridger Wilderness and is part of the largest grouping of glaciers in the American Rocky Mountains. The glacier is situated below the west flank of Gannett Peak, the tallest mountain in Wyoming.

References

See also
 List of glaciers in the United States

Glaciers of Sublette County, Wyoming
Glaciers of Wyoming